Cazadores de Monte should not be confused with the Cazadores de Montaña

Cazadores de Monte (Spanish for Jungle Huntsmen) are special jungle warfare troops of the Argentine Army.

Units 
As of December 2013, there are four Jungle Huntsmen units:
 12th Jungle Cazadores Company (Compañía de Cazadores de Monte 12), based at Puerto Iguazú, Misiones
 17th Jungle Cazadores Company (Compañía de Cazadores de Monte 17), based at Tartagal, Salta
 18th Jungle Cazadores Company (Compañía de Cazadores de Monte 18), based  at Bernardo de Irigoyen, Misiones
 19th Jungle Cazadores Company (Compañía de Cazadores de Monte 19), based at Formosa city, Formosa

See also 
12th Bush Brigade

References

Notes

External links 
 Official website
 Organization and equipment
 Argentine Infantry Official website

Argentine Army
Army units and formations of Argentina